William Byrd High School is a public secondary school located in Roanoke County, Virginia and is part of the Roanoke County Public Schools system.  The school has many successful athletic programs as well as award-winning music, theater, forensics, and scholastic bowl programs.

Education Feeder Pattern 
Elementary schools:
 Bonsack Elementary
 Herman L. Horn Elementary
 Mount Pleasant Elementary
 W. E. Cundiff Elementary

Middle schools:
 William Byrd Middle School

Athletics 
William Byrd participates in the following sports:

Boys:
 Baseball
 Basketball
 Cross Country
 Football
 Indoor Track & Field
 Lacrosse
 Outdoor Track & Field
 Soccer
 Swimming & Diving
 Tennis
 Wrestling

Girls:
 Basketball
 Cross Country
 Indoor Track & Field
 Lacrosse
 Outdoor Track & Field
 Soccer
 Softball
 Swimming & Diving
 Tennis
 Volleyball

Coed:
 Cheerleading (Competition & Sideline)
 Golf

References 

Public high schools in Virginia
Schools in Roanoke County, Virginia